Lita LaVaughn McClinton (January 7, 1952 – January 16, 1987) was an American socialite who was murdered the day her divorce was to be settled. She was the daughter of Georgia state representative JoAnn McClinton and former U.S. Department of Transportation official Emory McClinton.

McClinton was shot when receiving a box of pink roses at her doorstep. In 1997, Phillip Anthony Harwood was identified as the hit man and indicated that he had committed the murder for $25,000 at the behest of James Sullivan, the former husband of Lita McClinton, who had been in Palm Beach, Florida, during the shooting in Atlanta, Georgia. Sullivan escaped arrest by fleeing abroad. On July 2, 2002, he was arrested in Thailand, and in 2004, he was extradited to Atlanta. In March 2006, Sullivan was convicted of murder for arranging the 1987 shooting of his wife and sentenced to life imprisonment without parole, in a Georgia prison. The case was profiled on Unsolved Mysteries in 2001, the year before James Sullivan was arrested.

Philip Harwood has since been released.

Books 

 Marion Collins. The Palm Beach Murder (St. Martin's True Crime Library). Mass Market Paperback.  
 Debra Miller Landau. "Social Disgraces" (Atlanta Magazine, October 2004).
 Marvin Marable. "Deadly Roses - The Twenty Year Curse" (GCCI). . Available at www.amazon.com.

External links 
 
 Entry in African American Registry

1952 births
1987 murders in the United States
People from Georgia (U.S. state)
American murder victims
People murdered in Georgia (U.S. state)
Murdered African-American people
Deaths by firearm in Georgia (U.S. state)
1987 deaths